The 2017 FIRS Men's Roller Hockey World Cup was the 43rd edition of the Roller Hockey World Cup, organised by the Fédération Internationale de Roller Sports (FIRS). The tournament was held for the first time in China, in the city of Nanjing, from 3 to 9 September 2017, as part of the 2017 World Roller Games. Spain won his 17th title, defeating Portugal, who returned to the final, after an eleven years absence, in penalties.

Competition format
During the previous edition of the World Cup, the FIRS determined to end with the celebration of two different tournaments for divisions A and B, and merged all competitions in a whole event integrated in the World Roller Games. Finally the FIRS divided the 23 participant teams into three different competitions.

World Championship
The eight first ranked teams were divided into two groups. The three first qualified teams of each group will join the quarterfinals of the competition with the two group winners of the FIRS Cup groups.

The last qualified team of each group will be dropped to the quarterfinals of the FIRS Cup.

FIRS Cup
The eight teams ranked between 9th and 16th were also divided into two groups. The two group winners will join the quarterfinals of the World Championship while the six remaining teams will play the quarterfinals of the competition with the two teams dropped from the World Championship.

Confederations Cup
The remaining teams played the Confederations Cup. Initially the teams were divided into two groups with the two first qualified teams from each group joining a final stage, consisting in a round-robin tournament. After Egypt rellocation, the format was changed for just one group in a single roun-robin format.

Teams
The 23 teams were divided into three competitions according to their positions in the 2015 FIRS Men's Roller Hockey World Cup. The Division B was renamed as FIRS Cup and the new Division C was named as Confederations Cup.

The two top seeded teams were drawn in different groups. The draw was held in Barcelona on 5 July 2017.

After the withdrawal of Brazil, Egypt moved to FIRS Cup, and the confederation cup was redesigned into a single round-robin tournament.

World Championship

Group A

Group B

Knockout stage

Source: FIRS

5th to 8th position bracket

FIRS Cup

Group A

Group B
Brazil resigned to play the competition after the draw of the groups. Egypt occupied its berth.

Knockout stage

Source: FIRS

13th to 16th position bracket

Confederations Cup
After the reallocation of Egypt to the FIRS Cup, the competition system was modified to a single round-robin group.

Final standings

|-
| colspan="11"| Played the knockout stage
|-

|-
| colspan="11"| Played the knockout stage of the FIRS Cup
|-

|-
| colspan="11"| Played the Confederation Cup
|-

|}

References

External links
World Roller Games website

Roller Hockey World Cup
International roller hockey competitions hosted by China
Sport in Nanjing
FIRS World Championship
2017 in Chinese sport
September 2017 sports events in Asia